Victoria O'Keefe (27 March 1969 – 18 April 1990) was an English actress.

Her first role was in the 1983 television series Nanny. She also played Letty in the 1984 miniseries of the same name. She is best known for her role as Jane in the 1984 BBC docudrama Threads. Her last television appearance was as Tracey in the 15-minute short
Positively Negative in 1990.

Death
O'Keefe died on 17 April 1990 in a car accident near Bold, St Helens, Merseyside on the M62 motorway.

References

External links
Victoria O'Keefe website

1969 births
1990 deaths
English television actresses
Actors from Dewsbury
Actresses from Yorkshire
Road incident deaths in England
20th-century English actresses